The following is a series of lists of women's colleges in the United States. These are institutions of higher education in the United States whose student populations are composed exclusively or almost exclusively of women. They are often liberal arts colleges. There are approximately sixty active women's colleges in the U.S.

Current women's colleges are listed in bold text. Colleges that are closing or transitioning to coeducation are listed in italics. Former women's colleges that are now coeducational or have closed are listed in plain text.

Alphabetical by state

Alabama
 Alabama Central Female College, Tuscaloosa August 22, 1923 the main building burned down and became a park in the 1930s. No mention of the school after this date.
 Alabama Conference Female College, Tuskegee (originally Tuskegee Female College) From 1854 to 1909 college was in Tuskegee, then moved to Montgomery. Co-ed in 1934, then renamed Huntingdon College in 1935. Also known as Woman's College of Alabama.
 Athens Female Academy, Athens  (founded in 1822) Co-ed since 1931, later renamed Athens State University.
 Auburn (Masonic) Female College, Auburn (operated 1852–1870)
 Auburn Female Institute, Auburn (operated 1892–1908)
 Barber Memorial College, Anniston, Alabama Founded in 1896 and merged with Scotia Women's College in 1916 to create Barber–Scotia Junior College for women in Concord, NC. In 1954, Barber–Scotia College became a coeducational. Today, the college maintains close ties to the Presbyterian Church.
 Florence Synodical Female College, Florence, Alabama (operated 1855–1893)
 Huntsville Female College, Huntsville, Alabama (operated 1851–1895)
 Judson College, Marion (operated 1838–2021)
 University of Montevallo, Montevallo (co-ed since 1956) (also known as Alabama Girls' Industrial School)
 University of West Alabama, Livingston (co-ed since 1915; officially women-serving until the 1950s)

Arkansas
 Crescent College and Conservatory, Eureka Springs, Arkansas (operated 1908–1924)
 Galloway Female College, Searcy opened 1889 (merged with Hendrix College in 1933)

California
 Dominican University of California, San Rafael (co-ed since 1971) 
 Holy Names University, Oakland (co-ed since 1971; closing later in 2023) 
 Los Angeles Pacific College (defunct), East Los Angeles, California (co-ed 1960–1965)
 Marymount College of Los Angeles, Los Angeles (merged to create Loyola Marymount University in 1973)
 Mills College, Oakland (merged with Northeastern University in 2022)
 Mount St. Mary's University, Los Angeles
 Napa Ladies' Seminary
 Notre Dame de Namur University, Belmont (co-ed since 1967; graduate school since 2021) 
 Pitzer College, Claremont (co-ed since 1970)
 Presentation College, Los Gatos (closed in 1971)
 St. Joseph College, Orange (merged to create Loyola Marymount University in 1973)
 San Diego College for Women, San Diego (merged to create the University of San Diego in 1972)
 San Francisco College for Women, San Francisco (co-ed as Lone Mountain College in 1969, merged into University of San Francisco in 1978)
 Scripps College, Claremont

Colorado
 Colorado Women's College, Denver (closed in 1982; assets merged into the University of Denver)
 Loretto Heights College, Denver (closed in 1988; assets merged into the Regis University)
 Colorado Women's College Collaboratory, Denver (ceased admitting students in 2015)

Connecticut
 Albertus Magnus College, New Haven (co-ed since 1985)
 Annhurst College, South Woodstock (co-ed in 1972; closed in 1980)
 Connecticut College, New London (co-ed since 1969)
 Diocesan Sisters College, Bloomfield (closed in 1969)
 Hartford College for Women, Hartford (merged into the University of Hartford in 1991; closed in 2003)
 Hartford Female Seminary, Hartford (closed in the late 19th century)
 Litchfield Female Academy, Litchfield (closed in 1833)
 Maplewood Music Seminary, East Haddam
 Mount Sacred Heart College, Hamden (closed in 1997)
 University of Saint Joseph, West Hartford (fully co-ed since 2018, though it had admitted male graduate and evening students earlier)

District of Columbia
 Mount Vernon College for Women, Georgetown (closed in 1999; campus now part of George Washington University)
 Trinity Washington University, Washington (primary undergraduate college remains women-only)
 Washington College of Law at American University, Tenleytown (although female-serving and originally women-only, first admitted males in 1897)
 Dunbarton College of the Holy Cross, Washington, D.C., founded in 1935, closed in 1973

Florida
 Barry University, Miami Shores (co-ed since 1975)
 Bethune-Cookman University, Daytona Beach (founded as the Daytona Educational and Industrial Training School for Negro Girls; became co-ed in 1923 when it merged with Cookman Institute in Jacksonville to become a high school)
 Florida State University, Tallahassee (founded as "Seminary West of the Suwanee", a co-ed institution in 1851, became "Florida State College for Women" in 1905, and returned to co-education with current name in 1947)
 Lynn University, Boca Raton (co-ed since 1971)
 Saint Joseph College of Florida, Jensen Beach (closed in 1972)

Georgia
 Agnes Scott College, Decatur
 Americus Female College, Americus (closed in 1879)
 Andrew College, Cuthbert (co-ed since 1956)
 Bethel Female College, Cuthbert (closed in 1875)
 Brenau University, Gainesville
 Cox College, LaGrange and later College Park (closed in 1934)
 Georgia College & State University, Milledgeville (co-ed since 1967)
 Griffin Female College, Griffin (founded 1848)
 Hamilton Female College, Hamilton (closed in 1870)
 Houston Female College, Perry (closed in 1896)
 LaGrange College, LaGrange (co-ed since 1953)
 Madison Collegiate Institute and Methodist Female College, Madison (closed in 1880)
 Monroe Female Seminary (founded in 1829)
 Shorter University, Rome (co-ed since 1953)
 Sparta Female Seminary (founded in 1829)
 Spelman College, Atlanta
 Talbotton Female Seminary (founded in 1829)
 Tift College, Forsyth (merged with Mercer University in 1986; closed by Mercer in 1987)
 Valdosta State University, Valdosta (co-ed since 1950)
 Wesleyan College, Macon

Illinois
 Aurora University, Aurora (originally Mendota College, which became co-ed in 1860)
 Barat College of the Sacred Heart, Lake Forest (founded in 1858, became co-ed in 1973, purchased by DePaul University in 2001, closed in 2005)
 Dominican University, River Forest (co-ed since 1970; formerly Rosary College)
 Evanston College for Ladies, Evanston (merged with Northwestern University in 1873)
 Lexington College, Chicago (closed in 2014) 
 MacMurray College, Jacksonville (fully co-ed institution since 1969; a separate men's college formed in 1955; closed in 2020)
 Monticello College, Godfrey (closed in 1971)
 Mundelein College, Chicago (merged with Loyola University Chicago in 1991)
 North-Western Female College, founded in 1855; merged with Evanston College for Ladies and Northwestern University in 1873
 Rockford University, Rockford, IL (founded as Rockford Female Seminary in 1847; became a college in 1892 and co-ed in 1958) 
 Saint Xavier University, Chicago (co-ed since 1969)
 Shimer College, Chicago (co-ed since 1950; acquired by North Central College in 2017)
 University of St. Francis, Joliet (co-ed since 1971)

Indiana
 Coates College for Women, Terre Haute (closed in 1897)
 Long College for Women, Hanover (closed by Hanover College in 1978)
 Marian University, Indianapolis (co-ed since 1954)
 Moravian Seminary for Young Ladies, Hope, Indiana (operated 1866–1881)
 Saint Mary's College, Notre Dame
 Saint Mary-of-the-Woods College, St. Mary's (co-ed since 2015)
 University of Saint Francis, Fort Wayne (co-ed since 1957)

Iowa
 Briar Cliff University, Sioux City (co-ed since 1966)
 Clarke University (co-ed since 1979, renamed Clarke University in 2010)
 Decorah College for Women, Decorah (merged with Luther College in 1936)
 Marycrest International University, Davenport (co-ed in 1969, closed in 2002)
 Mount Mercy University, Cedar Rapids (co-ed since 1969) 
 Ottumwa Heights College, Ottumwa (co-ed in 1967; closed in 1980)

Kansas
 Newman University, Wichita (co-ed since 1965)
 Mount St. Scholastica College, Atchison (merged with all-male St. Benedict's College in 1971 to form Benedictine College)
 Oswego College for Young Ladies, Oswego (closed in 1910)
 University of Saint Mary, Leavenworth (co-ed since 1988)
 Vail College, Topeka (closed in 1928) (also known as College of the Sisters of Bethany)

Kentucky
 Green River Academy started in 1834 by the Cumberland Presbytery, now a museum run by the Green River Academy Preservation Society. 
 Beaumont College, Kentucky started as Baptist-affiliated Greenville Female Institution (1841-1856). When Dr. Samuel Mullens sold the school to John Augustus Williams (the founder of Christian College in Columbia, Missouri, and president of Bacon College when it was located in Harrodsburg), Williams changed the name to Daughters College and advertised that it could handle 100 students offering Philosophy, English language and literature, mathematics, natural science, history, ancient and modern languages, Bible studies, and fine arts. The college graduated classes of 2 to 17 each year; and after they added a regular normal department, produced more than 1/3 of all its graduates as teachers. In 1895 he sold it to Col. Thomas Smith, a graduate of University of Virginia and Confederate veteran, who taught the students seven different languages. It was he who changed the name to Beaumont College. It closed in 1917 and one of the graduates turned it into an inn to accommodate the high demand for accommodations from its graduates who wanted to return for vacations and class reunions.
 Bethel College, Russellville chartered by the state in 1854 as Bethel Female High School in Hopkinsville, the Green River Educational Convention named it the Bethel College for Women in 1858. The Russellville Convention used the college building for one of their meetings to establish the Kentucky Confederate government and soon thereafter was occupied by the federal army during the rest of the Civil War. The school finally opened again in March 1864, offering curriculum from five departments of languages, mathematics, mental and moral science, and belles-lettres, natural science, and fine arts. The college had a faculty of 6-10 teachers with an average attendance of approximately 100 students. By the 1890s the administration aspired to model the curriculum after that offered at the University of Virginia with an aim to make it equal to any of the male colleges in the state. It became Bethel Women's Jr. College in 1917; it became co-ed in 1951; and it closed in 1964.
 Brescia University, Owensboro, started in 1925 as Mount Saint Joseph College for Women, a junior college in the nearby rural community of Maple Mount. Shortly after the school opened, it established a coeducational extension branch in Owensboro that over the years became a second campus. The school became coeducational in 1950 when the two campuses were merged at the Owensboro site.
 Caldwell Female College, Danville, Kentucky, was originally chartered by the state as the Henderson Female Institute in 1854; changed its name in 1860 to honor the principle donor, Charles Caldwell who was an elder in the Danville Presbyterian Church. Consolidating with another local girls' school, Bell Seminary, Caldwell Female College gained its first woman president in 1886, Miss Charlotte A. Campbell. Under her leadership, a gymnasium and four new classrooms were added to the building's original site – and she gained a charter that allowed for the school with its 11 faculty to confer college degrees. In 1913 the charter was amended to consolidate with the Princeton Collegiate Institute and became Kentucky College for Women (see more on this below).
 Campbell–Hagerman College, Lexington (founded in 1903; closed in 1912)
 Cedar Bluff College, Woodburn, led by Rev. B.F. Cabell who also started the Potter College in Bowling Green (see more on this below); closed in 1892.
 Clinton College, Clinton, founded as Clinton Female College in 1873 by Willis White, a Baptist preacher and funded through the West Union Baptist Association (later the West Ky. Baptist Association); it became co-ed in 1876; and it closed in 1915.
 Elizabethtown Female Academy, Elizabethtown, incorporated in 1848, grew out of the boys-only Hardin Academy, established in 1806. Robert Hewitt, married to a local Methodist minister's daughter Eliza Ann Chastin, led the academy until his death in 1850. He was replaced by the 18-year-old Lafayette Hewitt until the Civil War broke out. Hewitt returned to Elizabethtown in 1865 and took up the principalship of the Female Academy for one year before moving to Frankfort.
 Georgetown Female College, Georgetown, founded in 1846 by J. E. Farnham, a natural sciences professor at Georgetown College; and by the next year a new building was constructed on Hamilton Street by the next year to accommodate 100 students. That building burned in 1865, and a professor of mathematics at Georgetown College, James J. Rucker, used his own private property to continue the school. For two years Prof. J.B. Thorp served as principal. In 1869 Professor Rucker stepped in as principal once Georgetown College built a new building on the college grounds. It was incorporated into the college in 1893 when it became co-educational. The building then became a dormitory.
 Hamilton College, Lexington was founded by banker and Christian Church (Disciples of Christ) member James M. Hocker in 1869. Originally named the Hocker Female College, in 1878 the name of the school changed to Hamilton College. By 1896 the graduating class was 24 women. In 1889, the nearby Kentucky University, (later Transylvania University), bought a stake in the school, taking total control in 1903. It remained a private, women's college affiliated with the Disciples of Christ and closed in 1932.
 John Lyle's Female Seminary (founded in 1806)
 Kentucky College for Young Ladies, Pewee Valley, was chartered and opened in fall 1874 with Professor E.A. Sloan, A.M. as president, 8 teachers offering a two-year preparatory school and a four-year collegiate course of studies. The college gained a new library donated by suffragist Mrs. Brutus J. (Ann Field) Clay. That year there were 68 students in attendance, most of whom were in the collegiate department, and the first class of nine graduated. In the 1880s, Rev. Erastus Rowley, D.D. of the Methodist Episcopal Church South, purchased the school and added a primary department as well as sciences, business and a normal department in the collegiate division. Boys were allowed for day classes when in 1896 the new president G.B. Perry combined the primary and preparatory departments into a preparatory course of four years and added a one-year postgraduate department which included then history, mathematics, science, Latin, mental and moral philosophy, English and "the usual ornamental branches." The faculty numbered 10 by the end of the century when the building was destroyed by fire. This school was the inspiration of "Lloydsboro Seminary" in one of the popular Little Colonel books by Annie Fellows Johnston, The Little Colonel at Boarding School (Boston: LC Page & Co, 1904). In 1902 the state purchased the school building for the use of a Confederate veterans' home.
 Kentucky College for Women, Danville, formerly Caldwell Female College, merged with Centre College in 1926 (as the women's department) but did not formally consolidate with Centre until 1930. Women students didn't move to the Centre campus until 1962 as part of a strategy to increase the size of the student body overall (from 380 to 700) and major revision of the curriculum.
 Lexington Female College, Lexington, Kentucky
 Logan Female College, Russellville grew out of the Methodist-affiliated school for boys and girls known as "The Academy" and was chartered by the state in 1856. Led by a succession of ministers out of the Louisville Conference of the Methodist Episcopal Church, the college was granted in 1860 by the state to confer diplomas under the name of the Russellville Collegiate Institute, but it returned to the name Logan Female College after the Civil War, graduating its first class of seven baccalaureate degree earners in 1869. It became famous in the 1870s for the curriculum in English and Anglo-Saxon. With a faculty of 12 in the 1890s the college curriculum included the departments of Latin, English, mathematics, natural science, history Bible studies, philosophy, political science, elocution, Anglo-Saxon, Greek, French and German – offering a Bachelor of Arts, Bachelor of Science and bachelor of laws. In addition the school offered primary and preparatory studies as well as departments of music and art. The Louisville Conference voted to close Logan Female College in 1931 due to financial problems.
 Lynnland Female Institute or Lynnland Female College, Glendale, Kentucky started in 1867 under the leadership of a local Baptist minister, Rev. G. A. Colson. In 1869, a former Confederate general, William F. Perry of Alabama (once the president of the East Alabama Female College in Tuskegee) came to serve as president of the Lynnland Female Institute and introduced a classical education for collegiate level learning. This was favorably received and he recruited support from John Peyton Hobson who was recommended by Washington College president, Robert E. Lee. In the 1870s Perry and Peter Eppes Harris turned the school co-educational as the Lynnland Military Institution with the women taught in a separate department. But it closed in 1879 and Perry left for Bowling Green where he taught at Ogden College until his death. By 1888 the school returned to its former status as a college for women and renamed "Lynnland Female College" growing to as many as 60 students and a school library that rivaled Barnard or Rutgers in the north. After the 1914–15 academic term, Lynnland was sold and became the site of an orphanage, the Kentucky Baptist Children's Home (later named the Glendale Center). Today the site is empty - the Glendale Center was relocated to Elizabethtown.
 Midway University, Midway — first opened in 1847 by the Disciples of Christ as the Kentucky Female Orphan School, it grew into a junior college and after World War II it offered baccalaureate degrees as one of Kentucky's few remaining women's colleges. By the mid-1970s, following the closure or change to coeducation of the state's other women's colleges, it became Kentucky's only remaining all-women's college. The school gradually transitioned away from being a pure women's college, establishing coeducational programs for evening, weekend, and later online students; during this time, it also abandoned an attempt to start a pharmacy school. The transition was completed in 2016 when men were first admitted to Midway's daytime undergraduate program.
 Millersburg Female College started first as a Female Collegiate Institute in Georgetown in 1837 by Thornton F. Johnson, affiliated with the Disciples of Christ, and run by his wife, Margaret Fauntleroy Johnson; he was also founder of several other colleges, including Bacon College, the precursor of University of Kentucky. Mrs. Johnson hired three sisters (Caroline, Sarah and Harriet Stanwood). They moved the college in 1849 to the Batterson residence in Millersburg, and through the 1850s it was coeducational. In February 1860 the state granted a charter to the Millersburg Female College, and in June 1867 it graduated its first class of four women. By the 1890s with 13 teachers, the graduates typically became musicians and teachers. In 1908 a new building replaced the structure that had burned down the year before and a basic junior college curriculum offered an associate of arts degree. In 1915 the Female College was renamed Millersburg College and in 1931 the nearby Millersburg Military Institute purchased it and offered there an elementary school for its junior cadets. College and a normal department was established in 1862. 
 Nazareth Academy, Nelson County — Founded in 1814 by the Catholic Sisters of Charity of Nazareth; moved from its original site outside of Bardstown to Nazareth in 1822. Received authority to grant degrees in 1829; later designated as a "College". For further history, see Spalding College below.
 Owensboro Female College opened in the fall of 1890 and chartered on March 26, 1893, to offer literary degrees: mistress of arts and mistress of belles-lettres. By 1931 the building was taken over by the Owensboro Trade School, and in 1939 the building was demolished in favor of a new building.
 Pleasant J. Potter College, Bowling Green opened on September 9, 1889, with Rev. B.F. Cabell as president. The charter assured no sectarian control by stipulated that not more than two of its ten trustees be members of the same religious denomination. In addition to music and art, the preparatory and collegiate departments offered English, history, natural sciences, Latin, mathematics, philosophy, elocution, Greek, French and German – offering certificates of proficiency as well as an A.B. Eleven faculty and 200 students many of whom transferred in from other institutions in the South and the West and at the end of the first year 9 graduated from the various departments of the college. Potter College closed in 1909, and Western State Normal School moved to the Potter College site in 1911 (which became Western Kentucky University in 1966).
 Sayre Female Institute, Lexington was founded by David A. and Abby Hammond Sayre in November 1854. Sayre, meeting in the offices of former Kentucky Secretary of State George B. Kinkead with several other prominent members of the "McChord" (now First Presbyterian Church) including John C. Breckinridge, drew up the articles of incorporation. Originally named the Transylvania Female Seminary, the school opened first in the old Bank of the U.S. building on the corner of Mill and Church then moved to the current location on Limestone Street. In 1855 the trustees changed the name to the Sayre Female Institute, and the state granted its charter in 1856 to confer collegiate degrees. By the 1890s the yearly attendance reached over 300 students with a faculty of nearly 15 teachers. Sayre graduated as many as 20 students each year, many of whom became teachers. It became co-ed after World War I and became a college preparatory school in 1962.
 Spalding College, Louisville — Founded in 1920 by the Sisters of Charity of Nazareth as the Louisville campus of Nazareth College. Instruction continued at both locations until 1971, when all instruction was moved to Louisville. The school became Spalding College in 1969, and became coeducational in 1973. It adopted its current name of Spalding University in 1984.
 St. Catharine College, Springfield (co-ed in 1951; closed in 2016) 
 Stanford Female College, Stanford, chartered in 1871 by a joint stock company; in the fall of 1872 it opened with Mrs. Sallie C. Truehart, A.M. as the first president, offering collegiate degrees with 11 teachers and approximately 100 students in primary, secondary and collegiate classes. In 1885 A.S. Paxton reformed the curriculum to model that of Washington and Lee University, and the school offered its graduates a diploma without degree from four of its departments, the degree of M.E.L. from completion of the English department and with additional work in Latin, a degree of A.B. The college closed in 1907 and the building housed the Stanford Elementary School until 1931 when it was converted into an apartment complex and since 1939 has served as a funeral home.
 Ursuline College, Louisville (merged into Bellarmine College in 1968)
 Villa Madonna College, Covington, was founded in 1921 by the Benedictine Sisters of Covington and chartered by the state in 1923. While Villa Madonna was a women's college, it ran many coeducational classes through an affiliation with the all-male St. Thomas More College. In 1945, Villa Madonna became coeducational and St. Thomas More was abolished. The school changed its name to Thomas More College in 1968, the same year it moved to its current campus in Crestview Hills, and adopted its current name of Thomas More University in 2018.

Louisiana
 College of the Sacred Heart, Grand Coteau (closed in 1956, see Academy of the Sacred Heart)
 Dodd College, Shreveport (closed in 1942)
 H. Sophie Newcomb Memorial College, New Orleans (discontinued by Tulane University in 2006)
 Keachi Female College, Keachi, in Desoto Parish (closed in 1912)
 Mansfield Female College, Mansfield (merged with Centenary College of Louisiana in 1930)
 Our Lady of Holy Cross College, New Orleans, (co-ed since 1967, became university in 2016)
 St. Mary's Dominican College, New Orleans (closed in 1984)
 Xavier University of Louisiana, New Orleans (co-ed since 1969 and 1972)

Maine
 Saint Joseph's College of Maine, Standish (co-ed since 1970)

Maryland
 Baltimore Female College, Baltimore, located on St. Paul Street, by East Saratoga Street, later in 1873 at Park Avenue/Place at Wilson Street, Bolton Hill, finally at Park Avenue and McMechan Street from 1883, President Nathan C. Brooks, (founded 1849, closed in 1890)
 Cambridge Female Academy (founded in 1830)
 Goucher College, Towson, (since 1910), formerly the "Women's College of Baltimore", located then at St. Paul Street and 23rd Street, Peabody Heights/Charles Village, (co-ed since 1986)
 Hood College, Frederick, (previously the "Woman's College of Frederick") (founded 1893, co-ed since 2002)
 Maryland College for Women, Lutherville (closed in 1952)
 Mount Saint Agnes College, Mount Washington, Baltimore (closed in 1971; then merged with all-male "Loyola College", now part of co-ed Loyola University Maryland)
 Mount Washington Female College, Mount Washington, Baltimore (closed in 1861)
 St. Mary's Female Seminary Junior College, St. Mary's County, in St. Mary's City (converted legally to coeducational in 1949, but in reality was still mostly female in its student body, then mostly a women's college); name also changed in 1949 to St. Mary's Seminary (dropping the word "female" from the name - not to be confused with a similarly named Roman Catholic institution in Baltimore on North Paca Street, later Roland Avenue and Belvedere Avenue/Northern Parkway), converted to a fully coeducational and four-year college in 1966; at which time name was changed to St. Mary's College of Maryland, and now associated with the state system of public state colleges (University System of Maryland)
 Notre Dame of Maryland University, (formerly "College of Notre Dame of Maryland", to be co-ed later in 2023; Meletia Hall remains women-only), Baltimore
 Patapsco Female Institute, Ellicott City, in Howard County, founded 1837 (closed in 1891)
 Saint Joseph College, Emmitsburg (closed in 1973 to merge with then-all-male Mount Saint Mary's University, which has been co-ed since then)
 Stevenson University, Stevenson (formerly Villa Julie College; co-ed since 1972)
 Woman's Medical College of Baltimore, Baltimore, (closed in 1910)

Massachusetts
 Anna Maria College, Paxton (co-ed since 1973)
 Aquinas College, Milton and Newton (closed in 2000)
 Bard College at Simon's Rock, Great Barrington (co-ed since 1970)
 Bay Path University, Longmeadow
 Bradford College, Haverhill (founded in 1803, co-ed in 1971; closed in 2000)
 Cardinal Cushing College, Brookline (closed in 1972)
 Elms College, Chicopee (co-ed since 1998)
 Emmanuel College, Boston (co-ed since 2001)
 Endicott College, Beverly (co-ed since 1994)
 Garland Junior College, Boston (merged into Simmons University in 1976)
 Ipswich Female Seminary, Ipswich (closed in 1878)
 Jackson College for Women, Medford (coordinate college of Tufts University; merged with School of Arts & Sciences in 1980)
 Lasell University, Newton (co-ed since 1997)
 Lesley College, Cambridge (a college of Lesley University; co-ed since 2005)
 Mount Holyoke College, South Hadley
 Mount Ida College, Newton (co-ed since 1972; closed in 2018 and acquired by University of Massachusetts at Amherst as Mount Ida Campus of UMass Amherst) 
 New England Female Medical College, Boston (merged into the Boston University School of Medicine in 1874)
 New England School of Law, Boston (co-ed since 1938)
 Newton College of the Sacred Heart, Newton Centre (merged with Boston College in 1974)
 Oread Institute, Worcester (closed in 1934)
 Pine Manor College, Chestnut Hill (co-ed since 2014; incorporated into Boston University in 2020)
 Radcliffe College, Cambridge (closed in 1999 and now an institute within Harvard University)
 Regis College, Weston (co-ed since 2007)
 Simmons University, Boston (While the school has online programs open to all, and has opened its graduate programs to men, its daytime undergraduate program remains women-only.)
 Smith College, Northampton
 Wellesley College, Wellesley
 Wheaton College (co-ed since 1987)
 Wheelock College, Boston (co-ed in 1967; merged with Boston University in 2018)

Michigan
 Madonna University, Livonia (co-ed since 1972) 
 Marygrove College, Detroit (co-ed in 1970, closed in 2019)
 Mercy College of Detroit, Detroit (co-ed date unknown; merged to form the University of Detroit Mercy in 1990)
 Michigan Female College, Lansing (began in 1855)
 Michigan Female Seminary, Kalamazoo (began in 1865)
 Siena Heights University, Adrian (co-ed since 1969)
 Young Ladies Seminary and Collegiate Institute, Monroe

Minnesota
 College of Saint Benedict, St. Joseph (Began a partnership with the nearby all-male Saint John's University in 1955, when the two schools started offering joint evening classes. Since 1961, the schools have operated a joint academic program with fully coeducational classes. Nonetheless, the schools remain legally and administratively separate, with separate residential facilities and athletic programs.)
 College of St. Scholastica, Duluth (co-ed since 1969)
 St. Catherine University, Saint Paul
 College of Saint Teresa, Winona (closed in 1989)
 Lea College, Albert Lea (co-ed date unknown; closed in 1973)
 Saint Mary's Junior College, Minneapolis (merged with St. Catherine University in 1985)

Mississippi
 All Saints' College (Vicksburg), Vicksburg (co-ed in 1971; closed in 2006)
 Blue Mountain College, Blue Mountain (co-ed since 2005)
 Chickasaw Female College, Pontotoc (closed in 1936)
 Corona College, Corinth (closed in 1862)
 Elizabeth Female Academy, Washington (founded in 1819, closed in 1845)
 Hillman College, Clinton (merged with Mississippi College in 1942)
 Mary Holmes College, West Point (co-ed in 1932; closed in 2003)
 Meridian Female College (closed in 1904)
 Mississippi University for Women, Columbus (co-ed since 1982)
 Mount Hermon Female Seminary, Clinton (closed in 1924)
 Port Gibson Female College, Port Gibson (closed in 1928)
 Sharon Female College, Sharon (closed in 1873)
 Union Female College, Oxford
 Whitworth College, Brookhaven (co-ed in 1950; closed in 1980)
 William Carey University, Hattiesburg (co-ed since 1954)

Missouri
 Avila University, Kansas City (co-ed since 1969)
 Baird College, Clinton (closed in 1898)
 Carlton College, Springfield (closed in 1861)
 Central Female College, Lexington (closed in 1924)
 Clinton College, Clinton (closed in 1904)
 Cottey College, Nevada
 Columbia College (Missouri), Columbia (co-ed since 1969)
 Forest Park College, St. Louis (closed in 1925)
 Hardin College and Conservatory of Music, Mexico (closed in 1931)
 Howard–Payne Junior College, Fayette (closed in 1927)
 Independence College, Independence (closed in 1898)
 Kansas City Ladies College, Independence (closed in 1905)
 Lindenwood University, St. Charles (co-ed since 1969)
 Madame Perdreville's School for Girls (founded in 1818)
 Marillac College, St. Louis (closed in 1974)
 Maryville University, Town and Country (co-ed since 1968) 
 Notre Dame College, St. Louis (closed in 1977)
 Patee Female College, St. Joseph (closed in 1868)
 St. Joseph Female College, St. Joseph (closed in 1881)
 St. Louis Female Academy (founded in 1823)
 Stephens College, Columbia
 Synodical College, Fulton (closed in 1928)
 Webster University, Webster Groves (co-ed since 1962)
 William Woods University, Fulton (co-ed since 1997)
 Woman's Medical College of St. Louis, St. Louis (closed in 1896)

Nebraska
 Clarkson College, Omaha (co-ed since the 1970s)
 College of Saint Mary, Omaha
 Servite College, Omaha (co-ed since the 1990s)

New Hampshire
 Miss Catherine Fiske's Young Ladies Seminary in Keene (founded in 1814)
 Colby–Sawyer College, New London (women's college from 1928 to 1990; co-ed since 1991)
 Mount Saint Mary College, Hooksett (closed in 1978)
 Notre Dame College, Manchester (became co-ed in 1985; closed in 2002; academic programs merged into Southern New Hampshire University)
 Pierce College for Women, Concord (closed in 1972)
 Rivier University, Nashua (co-ed since 1991)

New Jersey
 Assumption College for Sisters, Denville
 Bordentown Female College, Bordentown (closed in 1893)
 Caldwell University, Caldwell (co-ed since 1985)
 Centenary University, Hackettstown (co-ed since 1988)
 St. Elizabeth University, Morristown (co-ed since 2015)
 Douglass College (Rutgers University), New Brunswick (a residential college since 2007)
 Englewood Cliffs College, Englewood Cliffs (co-ed in 1969; closed in 1974)
 Evelyn College for Women, Princeton University, Princeton (closed in 1897)
 Felician University, Lodi and Rutherford (co-ed since 1986)
 Georgian Court University, Lakewood (co-ed since 2013)

New York
 Adelphi University, Garden City (women's college from 1912 to 1946)
 Barleywood Female University, Rochester (closed in 1853)
 Barnard College, Manhattan (affiliated with Columbia University, but independent)
 Bennett College, Millbrook (closed in 1978)
 Briarcliff College, Briarcliff Manor (closed in 1977)
 Cazenovia College, Cazenovia (co-ed since 1982)
 Chamberlain Institute and Female College, Randolph
 College of Mount Saint Vincent, Riverdale (co-ed since 1974)
 College of New Rochelle, New Rochelle (co-ed in 2016; merged into Mercy College in 2019)
 College of St. Rose, Albany (co-ed since 1969)
 Daemen University, Amherst (co-ed since 1971, Daemen College until 2022) 
 Dominican University, Orangeburg (co-ed since 1967, Dominican College until 2022)
 D'Youville University, Buffalo (co-ed since 1971, D'Youville College until 2022)
 Elmira College, Elmira (co-ed since 1969)
 Finch College, Manhattan (closed in 1975)
 Hunter College, Manhattan (co-ed since 1964)
 Ingham University, Le Roy (closed in 1892)
 Keuka College, Keuka Park (co-ed since 1985)
 Ladycliff College, Highland Falls, New York (co-ed in 1978, closed 1980)
 Kirkland College, Clinton (merged with Hamilton College in 1978)
 Manhattanville College, Purchase (co-ed since 1969)
 Marymount College, Tarrytown (closed by Fordham University in 2007)
 Marymount Manhattan College, Manhattan (co-ed since 1970)
 Mercy College, Dobbs Ferry (co-ed since the 1970s)
 Molloy University, Rockville Centre (co-ed since 1982, Molloy College until 2022) 
 Mount Saint Mary College, Newburgh (co-ed since 1970)
 Nazareth College, Pittsford (co-ed since the 1970s)
 New York Medical College for Women, Manhattan (closed in 1918)
 Notre Dame College, Staten Island (merged with St. John's University in 1971)
 Russell Sage College, Troy (co-ed since 2020 after it merged with Sage College of Albany)
 Sarah Lawrence College, Yonkers (co-ed since 1968)
 Skidmore College, Saratoga Springs (co-ed since 1971)
 Stern College for Women, Manhattan (a college of Yeshiva University)
 St. Joseph's University, Brooklyn, New York (co-ed since 1970, St. Joseph's College until 2022)
 Trocaire College, Buffalo (co-ed since 1972)
 Vassar College, Poughkeepsie (co-ed since 1969)
 Villa Maria College, Buffalo (co-ed since 1968)
 Wells College, Aurora (co-ed since 2005)
 William Smith College, Geneva (coordinate college of the Hobart and William Smith Colleges)

North Carolina
 Asheville Female College, Asheville
 Barber–Scotia College, Concord (co-ed since 1954)
 Bennett College, Greensboro
 Chowan University, Murfreesboro (co-ed since 1931)
 Concord Female Seminary, Statesville
 Flora MacDonald College, Red Springs (merged with all-male Presbyterian Junior College in 1958 to form St. Andrews University)
 Greensboro College, Greensboro (co-ed since 1954)
 Judson College, Hendersonville (operated 1882–92; co-ed date unknown)
 Lees-McRae College, Banner Elk (co-ed since 1931) 
 Linwood Female College, near Gastonia (co-ed 1915, closed 1921)
 Louisburg College, Louisburg (co-ed since 1931)
 Mecklenburg Female College, Mecklenburg
 Meredith College, Raleigh
 Montreat College, Montreat (women's college 1945–1959)
 Queens University of Charlotte, Charlotte (co-ed since 1987)
 Salem College, Winston-Salem
 University of North Carolina at Greensboro, Greensboro (co-ed since 1963)
 Wesleyan Female College, Murfreesboro (closed 1893)
 William Peace University, Raleigh (co-ed since 2012)

North Dakota
 University of Mary, Bismarck (co-ed since 1970)

Ohio
 Cincinnati Wesleyan Female Seminary, Cincinnati
 Edgecliff College, Cincinnati (co-ed since 1970; merged with Xavier University in 1980)
 Hillsboro Female College, Hillsboro
 Lake Erie College, Painesville (co-ed since 1985)
 Lourdes University, Sylvania (co-ed since 1975)
 Mount St. Joseph University, Cincinnati (co-ed since 1986, when it was known as the College of Mount St. Joseph)
 Notre Dame College, South Euclid (co-ed since 2001)
 Ohio Dominican University, Columbus (co-ed since 1964)
 Ohio Female College, Cincinnati (closed 1873)
 Ohio Wesleyan Female College, Delaware (closed in 1877; merged with Ohio Wesleyan University)
 Oxford Female Institute, Oxford, (merged with Miami University)
 Shepardson College for Women, Granville, Ohio (merged with Denison University in 1900)
 Steubenville Female Seminary, Steubenville (operated 1829–1898)
 Ursuline College, Pepper Pike
 Western College for Women, Oxford (closed in 1974; merged with Miami University)

Oklahoma
 Oklahoma College for Women (co-ed since 1965; currently named University of Science and Arts of Oklahoma)

Oregon
 Marylhurst University, Marylhurst (co-ed in 1974; closed in 2018)
 Mount Angel College, Mount Angel (closed in 1972)

Pennsylvania
 Alvernia University, Reading (co-ed since 1971)
 Arcadia University, Glenside (co-ed since 1972)
 Bryn Mawr College, Bryn Mawr
 Cabrini University, Radnor (co-ed since 1980)
 Carlow University, Pittsburgh (co-ed since 1945, though still women-serving)
 Cedar Crest College, Allentown
 Chatham University, Pittsburgh (co-ed since 2014)
 Chestnut Hill College, Philadelphia (co-ed since 2003)
 Gwynedd Mercy University, Gwynedd Valley (co-ed since 1966)
 Holy Family University, Philadelphia (co-ed since the 1970s) 
 Harcum College, Bryn Mawr (co-ed since 2003)
 Immaculata University, Malvern (co-ed since 2005)
 La Roche College, McCandless (co-ed since 1970) 
 Margaret Morrison Carnegie College, Pittsburgh (closed by Carnegie Mellon University in 1973)
 Marywood University, Scranton (co-ed since 1989)
 Mercyhurst University, Erie (co-ed since 1969)
 Misericordia University, Dallas (co-ed since the 1970s) 
 Moore College of Art and Design, Philadelphia
 Moravian College, Bethlehem (founded in 1742, co-ed since 1954)
 Mount Aloysius College, Cresson (co-ed since 1968) 
 Neumann University, Aston (co-ed since 1980)
 Pittsburgh Female College, Pittsburgh (closed in 1896)
 Rosemont College, Rosemont (co-ed since 2009)
 Seton Hill University, Greensburg (co-ed since 2002)
 Susquehanna Female College, Selinsgrove (closed in 1872, students transferred to the Missionary Institute of the Evangelical Lutheran Church, now Susquehanna University)
 Villa Maria College, Erie (merged into Gannon University in 1989)
 Wilson College, Chambersburg (co-ed since 2013)
 Woman's Medical College of Pennsylvania, Philadelphia (co-ed since 1970, now the Drexel University's College of Medicine)

Rhode Island
 Pembroke College, Providence (formerly coordinate college of Brown University; fully merged into Brown in 1971)
 Salve Regina University, Newport (formerly Salve Regina College; co-ed since 1975)

South Carolina
 Anderson University, Anderson (co-ed since 1930)
 Chicora College for Women, Columbia (merged with Queens College of Charlotte in 1930)
 Coker University, Hartsville (co-ed since 1969, Coker College until 2019)
 Columbia College, Columbia (co-ed since 2021)
 Columbia Female College, Columbia (closed in 1888)
 Converse University, Spartanburg (co-ed since 2021, Converse College until the same year)
 Due West Female College, Due West (merged with Erskine College in 1927, closed in 1928)
 Greenville (Baptist) Female College, Greenville (merged with Furman University in 1938)
 Johnson Female University, Anderson (operated from 1856 to 1863)
 Lander University, Greenwood (co-ed since 1943; prior to that, it was formerly called Williamston Female College)
 Laurensville Female College, Laurens (closing date unknown)
 Limestone University, Gaffney (co-ed since 1970, Limestone College until 2020)
 Old Cokesbury and Masonic Female College and Conference School, Cokesbury (educated women 1854–1874, educated boys 1876-1882, became a public school in 1918, closed in 1954)
 Orangeburg Female College, Orangeburg (closing date unknown)
 Reidville Female College, Reidville (closing date unknown)
 South Carolina Female Collegiate Institute, Barhamville in Columbia (closed in 1867)
 Spartanburg Female College, Spartanburg (closed in 1871)
 Summerland College for Women, Batesburg (closed in 1930)
 Walhalla Female College, Walhalla (closed in 1885)
 Winthrop University, Rock Hill (co-ed since 1974)
 Yorkville Female College, York (closed in 1880)

South Dakota
 Mount Marty University, Yankton (co-ed since 1969, Mount Marty College until 2020)
 Presentation College, Aberdeen (co-ed since 1968, closing later in 2023)

Tennessee
 Aquinas College, Nashville (co-ed since 1962)
 Belmont University, Nashville (co-ed since 1951) 
 Brinckley Female College, Memphis
 Cumberland Female College, McMinnville (operated 1850–1892)
 East Tennessee Female Institute, Knoxville (operated as the Knoxville Female Academy 1827–1846; East Tennessee Female Institute 1846–1911)
 Martin Female College, Pulaski – Founded in 1870; became Martin College in 1908 and became co-ed in 1938, with another name change to Martin Methodist College in 1986. The school was sold to the University of Tennessee system in 2021 and now operates as the University of Tennessee Southern.
 Mary Sharp College, Winchester (operated from 1851 to 1896)
 Moses Fisk's Female Academy (founded in 1806)
 Lambuth University, Jackson (became co-ed in 1923; closed in 2011)
 Newman College for Women, Jefferson City (merged into Carson-Newman College in 1888)
 Soule College for Women, Murfreesboro (closed in 1855)
 Tennessee College for Women, Murfreesboro (merged with Cumberland University in 1946)
 Ward–Belmont College, Nashville (closed in 1950)

Texas
 Carr–Burdette College, Sherman (closed in 1929)
 Chappell Hill Female College, Chappell Hill (closed in 1912)
 Charnwood Institute, Tyler (Co-ed from 1865 to 1874. Female only from 1874 to 1882)
 Eastern Texas Female College, Tyler (became Charnwood Institute in 1865)
 Hillyer Female College, Goliad (became Paine Female Institute in 1852)
 Kidd-Key College, Sherman (closed in 1935)
 Mary Allen Seminary, Crockett (became co-ed in 1933; closed in 1972)
 Mary Connor Female College, Paris
 University of Mary Hardin–Baylor, Belton (co-ed since 1971, originally female division of Baylor University)
 Our Lady of the Lake University, San Antonio  (co-ed since 1969)
 University of the Incarnate Word, San Antonio and Alamo Heights (originally named Incarnate Word School; became College and Academy of the Incarnate Word in 1909; co-ed since 1970, known as the University of the Incarnate Word since 1996)
 University of San Antonio, San Antonio (closed in 1942)
 Texas Woman's University, Denton, Dallas and Houston (co-ed since 1972; fully co-ed since 1994)
 Tillotson College, Austin (women's college from 1926 to 1935)
 Waco Female College, Waco (closed 1895)

Utah
 College of Saint Mary-of-the-Wasatch, Salt Lake City (closed in 1969)

Vermont
 Bennington College, Bennington (co-ed since 1969)
 College of St. Joseph, Rutland (co-ed in 1971, closed in 2019)
 Green Mountain College, Poultney (co-ed in 1974, closed in 2019)
 Trinity College of Vermont, Burlington (closed in 2000)

Virginia
 Averett University, Danville (co-ed since 1969)
 Blackstone College, Blackstone (closed in 1950)
 Chesapeake Female College, Hampton (operated 1854–1861)
 Elizabeth College, Salem (closed in 1922)
 Hartshorn Memorial College, Richmond (merged with Virginia Union University in 1932)
 Hollins University, Roanoke
 Longwood University, Farmville (co-ed since 1976)
 Madison College, Harrisonburg (de facto co-ed since 1946, officially co-ed since 1966; adopted current name of James Madison University in 1976)
 Marion College, Marion (closed in 1967)
 Martha Washington College, Abingdon (closed in 1931)
 Mary Baldwin University, Staunton (co-ed since 2017; the Virginia Women's Institute for Leadership cadet program remains all-female.)
 Marymount University, Arlington (co-ed since 1986)
 Radford University, Radford (co-ed since 1972)
 Randolph-Macon Woman's College, Lynchburg (co-ed since 2007 and renamed Randolph College)
 Roanoke Women's College, founded in 1912, merged with Elizabeth College in 1915. Elizabeth College burned under suspicious circumstances in 1921 and officially closed in 1922. Its alumnae and records were adopted by the nearby Roanoke College. 
 Southern Virginia University, Buena Vista (co-ed since 1994)
 Stratford College, Danville (closed in 1974)
 Sullins College, Bristol (closed in 1976)
 Sweet Briar College, Sweet Briar (almost closed in June 2015, but currently open and welcoming new and returning students)
 University of Mary Washington, Fredericksburg (co-ed since 1970)
 Virginia Intermont College, Bristol, Virginia (co-ed since 1972, closed in 2014)
 Westhampton College, Richmond (formerly coordinate college of University of Richmond; both undergraduate schools combined to form co-ed School of Arts and Sciences in 1990)

Washington
 Forest Ridge Junior College, Seattle (closed in 1957)
 Fort Wright College, Toppenish (closed in 1980; evolved into co-ed Heritage University)

West Virginia
 Alderson Academy, Alderson (merged into Broaddus College in 1932 to become Alderson–Broaddus College; current name of Alderson Broaddus University adopted in 2013)
 Broaddus College, Clarksburg and Philippi (Became co-ed in 1894 and moved from Clarksburg to Philippi in 1909. Merged with Alderson Academy to become Alderson–Broaddus College)
 Greenbrier College, Lewisburg (closed in 1972)

Wisconsin
 Alverno College, Milwaukee
 Cardinal Stritch University, Milwaukee (co-ed since 1970)
 Edgewood College, Madison (co-ed since 1970)
 Holy Family College, Manitowoc (co-ed since 1969; closed in 2020)
 Marian University, Fond du Lac (co-ed since 1970) 
 Milwaukee-Downer College, Milwaukee (merged with Lawrence College 1964)
 Mount Mary University, Milwaukee
 Sinsinawa Mound College, Sinsinawa
 Viterbo University, La Crosse (co-ed since 1970)

See also

Seven Sisters (colleges)
Timeline of women's colleges in the United States
Women's colleges in the Southern United States
Women's colleges in the United States
Women's College Coalition

References

Further reading
Creighton, Joanne V. A Tradition of Their Own: Or, If a Woman Can Now Be President of Harvard, Why Do We Still Need Women’s Colleges?.
 Harwarth, Irene B. "A Closer Look at Women's Colleges." National Institute on Postsecondary Education, Libraries, and Lifelong Learning, Office of Educational Research and Improvement, U.S. Department of Education, 1999.
---, Mindi Maline and Elizabeth DeBra. "Women's Colleges in the United States: History, Issues, and Challenges: Executive Summary." U.S. Department of Education National Institute on Postsecondary Education, Libraries, and Lifelong Learning.
Indiana University Center for Postsecondary Research (IUCPR). "New study finds women’s colleges are better equipped to help their students."
Horowitz, Helen Lefkowitz.  Alma Mater: Design and Experience in the Women's Colleges from Their Nineteenth-Century Beginnings to the 1930s, Amherst: University of Massachusetts Press, 1993 (2nd edition).
 Rosenberg, Rosalind. "The Limits of Access: The History Of Coeducation in America." In Women and Higher Education: Essays from the Mount Holyoke College Sesquicentennial Symposia. Ed. John Mack Faragher and Florence Howe. New York: Norton, 1988.

External links
Lists of Women's Colleges in the United States and Canada – Women's College Coalition

 
Lists of universities and colleges in the United States
Universities And Colleges In The United States